Following is a list of Pakistani architects along with either associated sites of significance or other reasons for their prominence within the field and country. The governing body is the Pakistan Council of Architects and Town Planners.

Kausar Bashir Ahmed (Karachi) former Dean of the Faculty of Architecture and Planning at Dawood College of Engineering and Technology, Karachi
 Nayyar Ali Dada (Lahore)
 Habib Fida Ali (Karachi)
 Abdur Rahman Hye (also known as A. R. Hye) pioneer of institutional architecture in Pakistan
 Yasmeen Lari (Karachi) Pakistan's first woman architect
 Nasreddin Murat-Khan (Lahore) architect of the Minar-e-Pakistan and other structures

See also

 Architecture of Pakistan
 List of architects
 List of Pakistanis

References

Pakistani
Architects